Verkhnyaya Uftyuga is a rural locality (a village) and the administrative center of Verkhneuftyugskoye Rural Settlement of Krasnoborsky District, Arkhangelsk Oblast, Russia. The population was 319 as of 2010. There are 8 streets.

Geography 
Verkhnyaya Uftyuga is located on the Severnaya Dvina River, 48 km east of Krasnoborsk (the district's administrative centre) by road. Andriyanovo is the nearest rural locality.

References 

Rural localities in Krasnoborsky District